"The Three Ravens" is an English folk ballad, printed in the song book Melismata compiled by Thomas Ravenscroft and published in 1611, but it is perhaps older than that. Newer versions (with different music) were recorded right up through the 19th century. Francis James Child recorded several versions in his Child Ballads (catalogued as number 26). 

The ballad takes the form of three scavenger birds conversing about where and what they should eat. One tells of a newly slain knight, but they find he is guarded by his loyal hawks and hounds. Furthermore, a "fallow doe", an obvious metaphor for the knight's pregnant ("as great with young as she might go") lover or mistress (see "leman") comes to his body, kisses his wounds, bears him away, and buries him, leaving the ravens without a meal. The narrative ends with "God send euery gentleman / Such haukes, such hounds, and such a Leman".

Text of the ballad
The lyrics to "The Three Ravens" are here transcribed using 1611 orthography. They can be sung either straight through in stanzas of four lines each, or in stanzas of two lines each repeating the first line three times depending on how long the performer would like the ballad to last. The second method appears to be the more canonical, so that is what is illustrated below. The refrains are sung in all stanzas, but they will only be shown for the first.

There were three rauens sat on a tree,
downe a downe, hay downe, hay downe,
There were three rauens sat on a tree,
with a downe,
There were three rauens sat on a tree,
They were as blacke as they might be.
With a downe, derrie, derrie, derrie, downe, downe.

The one of them said to his mate,
Where shall we our breakfast take?

Downe in yonder greene field,
There lies a Knight slain under his shield,

His hounds they lie downe at his feete,
So well they can their Master keepe,

His Hawkes they flie so eagerly,
There's no fowle dare him come nie

Downe there comes a fallow Doe,
As great with yong as she might goe,

She lift up his bloudy head,
And kist his wounds that were so red,

She got him up upon her backe,
And carried him to earthen lake,

She buried him before the prime,
She was dead her self ere euen-song time.

God send euery gentleman,
Such haukes, such hounds, and such a Leman.

The Twa Corbies

Written in the Scots language, there is no record of how early "The Twa Corbies" first performed. Child (I, 253) quotes a letter from Charles Kirkpatrick Sharpe to Walter Scott (August 8, 1802): "The song of 'The Twa Corbies' was given to me by Miss Erskine of Alva (now Mrs Kerr), who, I think, said that she had written it down from the recitation of an old woman at Alva." which indicates it was already known in Scotland at that date.  It was first published in Walter Scott's Minstrelsy in 1812. 

It has a more dark and cynical tone than the Three Ravens, from which its lyrics were clearly derived. There are only two scavengers in “The Twa Corbies”, but this is the least of the differences between the songs, though they do begin the same. Rather than commenting on the loyalty of the knight's beasts, the corbies tell that the hawk and the hound have forsaken their master, and are off chasing other game, while his mistress has already taken another lover. The ravens are therefore given an undisturbed meal, as nobody else knows where the man lies, or even that he is dead. They talk in gruesome detail about the meal they will make of him, plucking out his eyes and using his hair for their nests. Some themes believed to be portrayed in "Twa Corbies" are: the fragility of life, the idea life goes on after death, and a more pessimistic viewpoint on life. The loneliness and despair of the song are summed up in the final couplets;

O'er his banes [bones], when they are bare,
The wind sall [shall] blaw for evermair

There are a few different versions of this anonymously authored poem. The full text of at least one version of the poem is as follows:

As I was walking all alane,
I heard twa corbies making a mane;
The tane unto the t'other say,
‘Where sall we gang and dine to-day?’

‘In behint yon auld fail dyke,
I wot there lies a new slain knight;
And naebody kens that he lies there,
But his hawk, his hound, and lady fair.

‘His hound is to the hunting gane,
His hawk to fetch the wild-fowl hame,
His lady's taen another mate,
So we may mak our dinner sweet.

‘Ye'll sit on his white hause-bane,
And I'll pike out his bonny blue een;
Wi ae lock o his gowden hair
We'll theek our nest when it grows bare.

‘Mony a one for him makes mane,
But nane sall ken where he is gane;
Oer his white banes, when they are bare,
The wind sall blaw for evermair.’

This ballad was one of 25 traditional works included in Ballads Weird and Wonderful (1912) and illustrated by Vernon Hill.

Recordings
"The Three Ravens" and "Twa Corbies" have been performed and recorded by artists such as Heather Alexander, Annwn, A Chorus of Two, Ayreheart, Damh the Bard, Bishi, Boiled in Lead, Scott Boswell, Djazia Satour, Cécile Corbel, Clam Chowder, The Corries, Crooked Mouth, Alfred Deller, The Duplets, Frances Faye, Richard Dyer-Bennet, Fiddler's Dram, Ray Fisher & Archie Fisher, John Fleagle and Ewan MacColl, John Harle, The Hare and The Moon, Peter, Paul and Mary, Bert Jansch, Joel Cohen, Kalin Sivov, Andrew King, Seth Lakeman, Mandala Folk, Marie Little, Malinky, Old Blind Dogs, Omnia, Kate Price, Schelmish, Sol Invictus, Sonne Hagal, Sequester, Steeleye Span, Andreas Scholl, Hamish Imlach, Libera (choir), Richard Thompson, Ariella Uliano, Diana Obscura, Terre di mezzo, Kenneth McKellar, Custer LaRue and The Baltimore Consort, Merry Wives of Windsor, Sportive Tricks, The Creepy Bard, The Sands Family, Alice Moving Under Skies, Astral Weeks, Winterfylleth and Faun. The album Farewell Aldebaran contains a song clearly based on Three Ravens but the lyric credits go to Judy Henske, music by Jerry Yester.

In popular culture
The popular American rock band The Horrible Crowes takes its name from "Twa Corbies".
The song is featured in The Adventure Company's game Jack the Ripper and plays a major role in the gameplay.
The song is mentioned in Diana Gabaldon's novel The Fiery Cross, when Roger MacKenzie encounters some crows in the woods.
The song appears in the 1922 fantasy novel The Worm Ouroboros, by E. R. Eddison, sung by the Lady Mevrian in mourning for her lost brother. The novel was one of the favourites of J. R. R. Tolkien and C. S. Lewis.
Dorothy L. Sayers quotes the last two lines of the ballad in her mystery novel Clouds of Witnesses.
There is a story, The 3 Ravens, in Jim Henson's HBO special The Storyteller which, despite its title, is based on the German fairy tale The Six Swans.
The ballad was selected for use in the 2017 period film My Cousin Rachel, following a commission for a "dark" English folk tune sung at a Christmas feast for an early-1800s farmstead.
A recording of the song features in the credits for the 2014 Channel 4 period drama New Worlds, which is set in England during the 1680s.
The song, in a version by John Harle, features in Simon Schama's A History of Britain, particularly in the episodes "The Body of the Queen", "The British Wars" and "The Two Winstons".

Translations and adaptations in other languages
Both "The Three Ravens" and "Twa Corbies" have been translated to other languages, typically all sung to the same melody as Twa Corbies, or that of the Breton song called An Alarc'h (The Swan).

Known versions include:
 Danish: Ravnene (The Ravens), a translation of Twa Corbies (i.e. the cynical lyrics, sans the final stanza) by Danish folklorist Svend Grundtvig (1824–1883)
Hebrew: שלושה בני עורב (Three sons of a raven), translated by Nathan Alterman, and a more popular translation שלושה עורבים (Three ravens) by Yaakov Shabtai.
 Finnish: Kaksi korppia is a translation of "Twa Corbies" by Finnish band Tarujen Saari.
 Frisian: De twa roeken, translated by Klaes Bruinsma, sung by Doede Veeman on his LP "Frustraasjebloes".
 German: Die drei Raben, a quite literal translation of The Three Ravens, by Theodor Fontane (1819–1898). Die zwei Raben by the same author, is the best known German version of Twa Corbies.
 the German medieval/rock crossover group Schelmish wrote a German version of The Three Ravens lyrics, also titled Rabenballade (Raven's Ballad).
 also, the German group Subway to Sally wrote the song Krähenfraß (Food for the Crows), also based on the Twa Corbies version and using a very similar melody, but with even more sinister lyrics. This version places the story in our times, replaces the knight with a soldier, and adds a new stanza in the end, loosely translating to "the bare bones will be clean / and preserved for a long time / and announce shining from the dirt / what a soldier's purpose is" (namely: the song title).
 the German Neo-Medieval group Die Streuner has their own version titled "Rabenballade", with a rather emotional melody and cynical lyrics: Not only do the dogs stop guarding their master, they eat his flesh the next day. The falcons (not mentioned to be his own) are simply "no longer seen" and the maid "already that evening doesn't sleep alone".
the Czech folk music group Spirituál kvintet adapted the melody of The Three Ravens to record a song Válka růží . However, the theme has been completely changed, as the new lyrics concerned the Wars of the Roses between Yorks and Lancasters.
the Czech folk music group Asonance adopted the Twa Corbies in very lyric translation, quite similar to original.
the Czech folk metal group Hakka Muggies used the tune in song Havrani (lit. Ravens). The lyrics however follow a story of two Scottish outlaw brothers, so the ravens are rather metaphorical.
 the Czech group Ječmen playing Irish folk used the tune and text from Asonance to make a funny version about two chickens trying to survive after they've eaten all the barley and their master cannot make whisky.
 Norwegian: Ravnene (The Ravens), a translation very similar to the Danish version. The Norwegian folk rock group Folque performed this song on their debut album, and used a tune very similar to Steeleye Span's version.
 Russian: The great Russian poet Aleksandr Sergeyevich Pushkin published in 1828 partial translation of the French translation of Sir Walter Scott's Border Poems. It includes the poem entitled "Шотландская песня" (Scottish Song), which has become known to almost every literate Russian-speaking person. Pushkin's translation contains only the first half of the poem, ending with "and the mistress awaits for her lover, not the killed one, but the alive one", thus making a dark hint the central point of the story. Many composers of the time wrote musical interpretations of the poem .
 the Russian folk band Sherwood  recorded a Russian-language version of Twa Corbies in their album "Sweet Joan" (2010) using their own translation.
 Basque: Bi beleak is a translation of "Twa Corbies" from the Basque poet Jon Mirande, sung by the Basque singer Imanol Larzabal.
The Polish folk band Odpust Zupełny recorded a Polish-language version 'Ballada o dwóch krukach' (Ballad of two ravens).

See also
List of Child Ballads

Notes

Files
 (German) – a parody of “The Three Ravens”.

External links

Written works
The various versions of these ballads as collected by Child
Online text: Minstrelsy Ancient and Modern by William Motherwell, 1827. Twa Corbies is on page 7.
Music and words for choral version - general license

Recorded music and videos
The Three Ravens by Andy Niedermeier
The Three Ravens video by Andy Niedermeier
The Three Ravens sung by Sarah Leonard on John Harle's CD Terror and Magnificence
"The Three Ravens" Explicated Chatman — 1963
The Three Ravens — The Facts on File companion to British poetry before 1600

Further reading
A literary analysis of the work: Vernon V Chatman III, “The Three Ravens Explicated,” Midwest Folklore, Vol. XIII #3, Summer 1963

Songs about birds
Fictional trios
Traditional ballads
Child Ballads
Year of song unknown
Songwriter unknown
17th-century songs